Clatter is a small village in Powys, Wales located in the community of Caersws on the main A470 road between Carno and Caersws village.

External links 
Photos of Clatter and surrounding area on geograph.org.uk

Villages in Powys
Caersws